East Sussex National Golf Club is a golf course located near to Uckfield in East Sussex. It is considered one of the finer golf courses in the British Isles. There are two 18 hole courses designed by Bob Cupp.

The East Course measures 7,081 yards and is designed for tournament play. It has been the setting for  the European Open on two occasions. The West Course is a par 72 and is 7,154 yards and hosted the Challenge Tour Championship between 1995 and 1998 and the European Tour Qualifying School between 1994 and 1997.

References

External links
 http://www.eastsussexnational.co.uk/

Golf clubs and courses in East Sussex
Little Horsted